The 1919 Schwarzburg-Rudolstadt state election was held on 9 March 1919 to elect the 17 members of the Landtag of Schwarzburg-Rudolstadt.

Results

References 

Schwarzburg-Rudolstadt
Elections in Thuringia